The flag of Vladimir Oblast, a federal subject of Russia, was adopted 28 April 1999.  The flag is a field of red with a light blue band on the hoist. The band is 1/8 the length of the flag and has a hammer and sickle at the top. The field is charged in the center with the coat of arms of Vladimir Oblast, which is 1/3 the length of the field. The ratio of the flag is 2:3.

The flag design is based on the 1954 Flag of the Russian SFSR.

Historical flags

References

Flag of Vladimir Oblast
Flags of the federal subjects of Russia
Vladimir
Flags displaying animals